Heinrich Christian Johann Spoerl (1887–1955) was a German author.

Biography
Spoerl was born on 8 February 1887 in Düsseldorf, where he also grew up.  He studied jurisprudence in Marburg, Berlin and Munich and was a solicitor in Düsseldorf from 1919 till 1937. He became a full-time writer in 1937 when he moved to Berlin, which he left in 1941 to move to Bavaria. He took up law again from 1945 till 1948. He died on 25 August 1955 in Rottach-Egern.

Spoerl wrote a number of humorous novels and comedies, most of which were made into films:
 Die Feuerzangenbowle, 1933
 Wenn wir alle Engel wären, 1936
 Der Maulkorb, 1936
 Der Gasmann, 1940
 Die Hochzeitsreise, 1946
 Die weisse Weste, 1946

References
Dtv Lexikon, Band 17, Munich 1970, p. 203

External links
 

1887 births
1955 deaths
20th-century German dramatists and playwrights
20th-century German male writers
20th-century German novelists
German humorists
German male dramatists and playwrights
German male novelists
Writers from Düsseldorf
People from the Rhine Province